Arthur W. Briggs (July 6, 1884 – December 20, 1949) was an American football, basketball, baseball and track and field coach. He served as the head football (1912–1917, 1919–1933), men's basketball (1913–1918, 1919–1923), baseball (1914–1917), and track coach at Missouri State University (then known as Southwest Missouri State College) in Springfield, Missouri.

Briggs played college football at Springfield College in Springfield, Massachusetts

References

External links
 

1884 births
1949 deaths
Basketball coaches from Massachusetts
Springfield Pride football players
Missouri State Bears football coaches
Missouri State Bears basketball coaches
Missouri State Bears baseball coaches
Missouri State Bears and Lady Bears athletic directors
Players of American football from Massachusetts
Sportspeople from Salem, Massachusetts